The 1978 Tipperary Senior Hurling Championship was the 88th staging of the Tipperary Senior Hurling Championship since its establishment by the Tipperary County Board in 1887.

Kilruane MacDonaghs entered the championship as the defending champions.

On 15 October 1978, Kilruane MacDonaghs won the championship after a 2-14 to 2-13 defeat of Roscrea in the final at Semple Stadium. It was their second championship title overall and their second title in succession.

Results

Quarter-finals

Semi-finals

Final

Championship statistics

Top scorers

Overall

In a single game

References

Tipperary
Tipperary Senior Hurling Championship